The Newark Newks was the predominant name of a minor league baseball team based in Newark, Ohio from 1905 until 1915. The team was first known as the Newark Idlewilds and began playing in the Ohio–Pennsylvania League. In 1906 the club changed its name to the Newark Cotton Tops. Finally in 1907, the team took on the Newks name. In 1908 the team moved in the Ohio State League, where they played until 1911. On June 22, 1911, the team moved to Piqua, Ohio to become the Piqua Picks. However that June, the Grand Rapids Furniture Makers of the Central League moved to Newark and became the Newark Skeeters. The next season the Skeeters played in the Ohio State League and posted a 72–68 record before vanishing. The city fielded the Newark New Socks (sometimes referred to as the Newsocks in the 1915 Buckeye League. Newark was without a team until the 1944 Newark Moundsmen returned to play in the Ohio State League.

Year-by-year record

Timeline

References
Baseball Reference Newark, Ohio

Baseball teams established in 1905
Baseball teams disestablished in 1915
Defunct minor league baseball teams
1905 establishments in Ohio
1915 disestablishments in Ohio
Defunct baseball teams in Ohio
Ohio State League teams
Ohio-Pennsylvania League teams